The continental shelf of the United States is the total of the continental shelves adjacent to the United States. In the context of the international law as defined by the United Nations Convention on the Law of the Sea, it is seabed and subsoil of the submarine areas over which the United States exercises its sovereign rights.

The submerged part of the U.S. continental shelf that is seawards and outside of the jurisdictions of the individual U.S. states is called the Outer Continental Shelf. This Outer Continental Shelf is a peculiarity of the political geography of the United States and is the part of the internationally recognized continental shelf of the United States.

References

Landforms of the United States
Coasts of the United States
United States